The 1860–1861 New Zealand general election was held between 12 December 1860 and 28 March 1861 to elect 53 MPs to the third session of the New Zealand Parliament. 13,196 electors were registered.

1860 was the year gold miners who held a Miner’s Right continuously for at least three months were able to vote without having to own, lease or rent property.

Results

Notes

References